Assassin's Creed is an open-world, action-adventure, and stealth game franchise published by Ubisoft and developed mainly by its studio Ubisoft Montreal using the game engine Anvil and its more advanced derivatives. Created by Patrice Désilets, Jade Raymond, and Corey May, the Assassin's Creed video game series depicts a fictional millennia-old struggle between the Order of Assassins, who fight for peace and free will, and the Knights Templar, who desire peace through order and control. The series features historical fiction, science fiction, and fictional characters intertwined with real-world historical events and historical figures. In most games, players control a historical Assassin while also playing as an Assassin Initiate or someone caught in the Assassin–Templar conflict in the present-day framing story. Considered a spiritual successor to the Prince of Persia series, Assassin's Creed took inspiration from the novel Alamut by the Slovenian writer Vladimir Bartol, based on the historical Hashashin sect of the medieval Middle East.

The first Assassin's Creed was released in 2007, and it has featured twelve main games in total, the most recent being Assassin's Creed Valhalla in 2020. Main games in the Assassin's Creed series are set in an open world and played from the third-person view. Gameplay revolves around combat, stealth, and exploration, including the use of parkour to navigate the environment. The games feature both main and side missions, and some titles also include competitive and cooperative multiplayer game modes.

A new story and occasionally new time periods are introduced in each entry, with the gameplay elements also evolving. There are three overarching story arcs in the series. The first five main games follow Desmond Miles, a descendant of several important Assassins throughout history, who uses a machine called the Animus to relive his ancestors' memories and find powerful artifacts called Pieces of Eden while also attempting to prevent a catastrophic event, referencing the 2012 phenomenon, said to wipe out humanity by the end of 2012. From Assassin's Creed IV: Black Flag to Assassin's Creed Syndicate, Assassin initiates and employees of Abstergo (a company used as a front by the modern-day Templars) record genetic memories using the Helix software, helping the Templars and Assassins find new Pieces of Eden in the modern world. The most recent games, Assassin's Creed Origins, Assassin's Creed Odyssey, and Valhalla, follow ex-Abstergo employee Layla Hassan on her own quest to save humanity from another disaster.

The main games in the Assassin's Creed franchise have received generally positive reviews for their ambition in visuals, game design, and narratives, with criticism for the yearly release cycle and frequent bugs, as well as the prioritising of role-playing mechanics in later titles. The series has received multiple awards and nominations, including multiple Game of the Year awards. It is commercially successful, selling over 200 million copies , becoming Ubisoft's best-selling franchise and one of the highest selling video game franchises of all time. While main titles are produced for major consoles and desktop platforms, multiple spin-off games have been released for consoles, mobiles, and handheld platforms. A series of art books, encyclopedias, comics, novelizations, and novels have been also been published. A live-action film adaptation of the series, titled Assassin's Creed, was released in 2016.

Development history
While the games in the series have had several narrative arcs, Ubisoft views the series as currently having three periods of development and design philosophy. Phase one, covering up to Assassin's Creed Syndicate, featured games structured around single-player content, and while centering on open world spaces and several role-playing elements, were more action-adventure and stealth-oriented. Period two, covering from Assassin's Creed Origins to Assassin's Creed Mirage, brought in more role-playing elements and live-service features to increase player engagement. Period three will launch with Assassin's Creed: Red, using lessons from the second period of development to make engrossing single-player games similar to the original titles but with features to allow players to share achievements and content with others, all to be backed by the Infinity hub system.

Phase One
The first Assassin's Creed game originated out of ideas for a sequel for Ubisoft's video game Prince of Persia: The Sands of Time, aiming for the seventh generation of video game consoles. The Ubisoft Montreal team decided to take the gameplay from The Sands of Time into an open-world approach, taking advantage of the improved processing power to render larger spaces and crowds. Narratively, the team wanted to move away from the Prince being someone next in line for the throne but to have to work for it; combined with research into secret societies led them to focus on the Order of Assassins, based upon the historical Hashashin sect of Ismaili, who were followers of Shia Islam, heavily borrowing from the novel Alamut. Ubisoft developed a narrative where the player would control an Assassin escorting a non-playable Prince, leading them to call this game Prince of Persia: Assassin, or Prince of Persia: Assassins. Ubisoft was apprehensive to a Prince of Persia game without the Prince as the playable character, but this led the marketing division to suggest the name Assassin's Creed, playing off the creed of the Assassins, "nothing is true; everything is permitted". Ubisoft Montreal ran with this in creating a new intellectual property, eliminating the Prince, and basing it around the Assassins and the Knights Templar in the Holy Land during the 12th century. Additionally, in postulating what other assassinations they could account for throughout history, they came onto the idea of genetic memory and created the Animus device and modern storyline elements. This further allowed them to explain certain facets of gameplay, such as accounting for when the player character is killed, similar to The Sands of Time.

After Assassin's Creed was released in 2007, Ubisoft Montreal said they looked to "rework the global structure" in developing the sequel, Assassin's Creed II. They felt that parkour was underutilized in the first game and designed the world in the sequel to feature freerun highways to make it easier to enter into parkour moves, for example using rooftops to escape pursuits. The change in setting meant that the game would feature a new cast of characters, including a new protagonist, Ezio Auditore da Firenze. Assassin's Creed II also brought in more use of crowds to hide in plain sight that the developers had seen used in Hitman: Blood Money, adding more to the concept of social stealth as a gameplay option. Finally, Ubisoft Montreal completely reworked the repetitive mission structure from the first game through numerous side activities, collectibles, and secrets. These additions became a central part of the series going forward as well as other Ubisoft games like Watch Dogs, Far Cry, and Tom Clancy's Ghost Recon. Assassin's Creed II was followed by two sequels, Assassin's Creed: Brotherhood and Assassin's Creed: Revelations, which also featured Ezio as the main protagonist and introduced the ability for players to recruit NPCs as Assassins and manage them in missions.

Assassin's Creed III originated from both Ubisoft Montreal, who wanted to progress the series' narrative forward in time, and to an unattached project that had been developed at Ubisoft Singapore and featured naval ship combat. As the main team had settled into the American Revolution period for the game, they found the ship-to-ship combat system fitted with the story and redesigned the setting to incorporate it further. Another major change in Assassin's Creed III was transitioning the parkour and freerun systems to work in the natural woodlands of 18th-century Massachusetts and New York. This further allowed the adding of trees and other vegetation within the city areas themselves, not just as part of the parkour systems, but to add more varied environments, which would continue as part of the series' ongoing design.

For Assassin's Creed IIIs sequel, Assassin's Creed IV: Black Flag, the Ubisoft team built upon the foundation of its predecessor, particularly with regards to the naval gameplay, merging it seamlessly with the land-based gameplay. The team also used the game as a chance to address aspects of the series' storyline. Choosing to focus on an outsider's perspective to the Assassin–Templar conflict, they set the game around the Golden Age of Piracy, with the protagonist, Edward Kenway, initially starting out as a pirate who initially becomes involved in the conflict with the prospect of wealth. Similarly, after the conclusion of Desmond Miles' story arc in Assassin's Creed III, the modern-day segments put players in the role of a nameless individual. The team chose this approach because they believed it allowed players to more easily identify themselves in their character. This trend would continue in the series until Assassin's Creed Syndicate.

Development of Assassin's Creed Unity began shortly after the completion of Brotherhood in 2010, with the core development team splitting off during the early stages of development on Assassin's Creed III. As the first game in the series to be released exclusively for the eighth generation of video game consoles, Unity featured a graphical and gameplay overhaul. The setting chosen for the game was Paris during the early years of the French Revolution, with players taking control of a new Assassin named Arno Dorian. After Unity, Ubisoft released Assassin's Creed Syndicate in 2015.

Phase Two
After Syndicate, Ubisoft decided that the series needed a major reinvention across both gameplay and narrative. It was decided to make the next game, Assassin's Creed Origins, closer to a role-playing video game than a stealth-action game, which would also bring a game with many more hours of play than previous titles. Some long-standing features of the series were eliminated for this purpose, such as the social stealth mechanic. This changed how missions were presented — rather than being linearly directed through the Animus, the player character could meet various quest givers in the game's world to receive missions. From the narrative side, Ubisoft placed the game before the formation of the Assassin Brotherhood in Ancient Egypt to make the player character, Bayek of Siwa, a medjay that people would respect and seek the help of. The modern-day storyline also shifted back to a single character, Layla Hassan. The developers limited the number of playable sequences for her character compared to previous games but gave them more meaning, such as allowing the player to explore Layla's laptop with background information on the game's universe.

Origins was followed in 2018 by Assassin's Creed Odyssey, which shifted the setting to Classical Greece and followed a similar approach to its predecessor but with more emphasis on the role-playing elements. 2020's Assassin's Creed Valhalla, set in Medieval England and Norway during the Viking Age, continued the same style as Origins and Odyssey. The developers recognized feedback from the previous two games and brought back the social stealth elements, as well as the concept of a customizable home base that was first introduced in Assassin's Creed II.

Future
In 2022, Ubisoft announced several additional games for the series. Assassin's Creed Infinity has been described by its executive producer, Marc-Alexis Côté, as a "new design philosophy" for the series, as well as a hub that will provide the releases of future games. The first two games to be included in Infinity will be Assassin's Creed: Red, set in Feudal Japan, and Assassin's Creed: Hexe, rumoured to be set in Central Europe in the 16th century. Ubisoft also announced Assassin's Creed Mirage, a smaller game intended to bring the series back to its stealth-oriented roots. The game is expected to release in 2023, and is set in Baghdad twenty years before the events of Valhalla.

Gameplay

The Assassin's Creed games are centered around one or more fictional members of the Order of the Assassins. Their memories are experienced by an in-game character in the modern-day period through a device called the Animus and its derivations. The Animus allows the user to explore these memories passed down via genetics. Within the context of the game, this provides a diegetic interface to the real-world player of the game, showing them elements like health bars, a mini-map, and target objectives as if presented by the Animus. Additionally, should the player cause the historical character to die or fail a mission, this is rectified as desynchronization of the genetic memory, allowing the player to try the mission again. Through the Animus interface, the player can retry any past mission already completed; for example, in Assassin's Creed: Brotherhood, the player achieves better synchronization results by performing the mission in a specific manner, such as by only killing the mission's target. The Animus also imparts special abilities to the modern-day character that helps them to see their target in a crowd or other unique points of interest.

While playing as the Assassin characters, the games are generally presented from a third-person view in an open world environment, focusing on stealth and parkour. The games use a mission structure to follow the main story, assigning the player to complete an assassination of public figureheads or a covert mission. Alternatively, several side missions are available, such as mapping out the expansive cities from a high perch followed by performing a leap of faith into a haystack below, collecting treasures hidden across the cities, exploring ruins for relics, building a brotherhood of assassins to perform other tasks, or funding the rebuilding of a city through purchasing and upgrading of shops and other features. At times, the player is in direct control of the modern-day character who, by nature of the Animus use, has learned Assassin techniques through the bleeding effect, as well as their genetic ability of Eagle Vision, which separates friend, foe, and assassination targets by illuminating people in different colors.

The games use the concept of active versus passive moves, with active moves, such as running, climbing the sides of buildings, or jumping between rooftops, more likely to alert the attention of nearby guards. When the guards become alerted, the player must either fight them or break their line of sight and locate a hiding place, such as a haystack or a well, and wait until the guards' alert is reduced. The combat system allows for a number of unique weapons, armor, and moves, including the use of a hidden blade set in a bracer on the Assassin's arm, which can be used to perform surreptitious assassinations.

Storyline

Premise 
The Assassin's Creed games primarily revolve around the rivalry and conflict between two ancient secret societies: the Order of Assassins, who represents freedom, and the Knights Templar, who represents order. Versions of these societies have existed for centuries, with the Assassins seeking to stop the Templars from gaining control of Pieces of Eden, artifacts that can override free will to control people.

These artifacts are remnants of an ancient species pre-dating humanity called the Isu, or Precursors, which created humanity to live in peace alongside them. The Isu ensured humans could not rise against them by creating the Pieces of Eden to control them. When the first hybrid Isu-human beings emerged, named Adam and Eve, they were immune to the effects of the Pieces of Eden. They stole the Pieces of Eden, which led to a great war that ended when a massive solar flare devastated the surface of the Earth. The Isu began to die out while humanity thrived. Three Isu—Minerva, Juno, and Jupiter—attempted to prepare humanity for a solar flare they knew would come centuries later. Minerva and Jupiter prepared vaults from which humanity could activate a protective shield around Earth with the Pieces of Eden and the Eye, a means to communicate how to find and use these vaults; however, Juno saw humanity as a threat and attempted to sabotage Minerva and Jupiter's plan. Minerva and Jupiter were forced to destroy Juno, unaware she had hidden her consciousness to wake upon activation of the Eye. All that remained of the Isu were the traces of their memories in the world's mythologies, and religions, while the Pieces of Eden were lost to time.

The series takes place in the modern era, in which the Templars have established the mega-corporation Abstergo Industries. Abstergo has developed a device, the Animus, whose user can relive the memories of their ancestors through their genetic material. Abstergo has kidnapped people who are descendants of past Assassins to locate the missing Pieces of Eden via the Animus. A user of the Animus can move about in simulated memories as their ancestor, but performing actions outside the bounds of what their ancestor did can lead to desynchronization of the memory. Extended use of the Animus creates a bleeding effect that gives users some of the skills and capabilities they experienced with their ancestor.

Story arcs 

The first five main games in the series focus on Desmond Miles, a bartender who learns he is a descendant of several important Assassins throughout history, including Altaïr Ibn-LaʼAhad from the Middle East during the Third Crusade; Ezio Auditore da Firenze from the Italian Renaissance during the late 15th and early 16th centuries; and Ratonhnhaké:ton (better known as Connor), a half-Mohawk, half-British Assassin during the American Revolution. Desmond is used by Abstergo to find Pieces of Eden but is freed by Lucy Stillman, an undercover agent for the Assassins. Lucy takes Desmond to meet Shaun Hastings and Rebecca Crane, two other members of the modern-day Assassins. The group is joined later by William Miles, Desmond's father. They continue to explore Desmond's memories and eventually discover the Eye and Minerva's warning of another possible solar flare. They also inadvertently free Juno, who then kills Lucy, revealed to be a double agent for the Templars. The group continues to find the vaults across the globe via Desmond's memories, and Desmond ultimately activates them in time to block the solar flare, at the cost of his own life.

Starting with Assassin's Creed IV: Black Flag, William goes into exile, while Shaun and Rebecca continue to monitor Abstergo by posing as employees of one of their spin-off companies, Abstergo Entertainment. Abstergo has refined the Animus technology to allow anyone to experience genetic memories from the DNA material of another person, allowing Abstergo to continue their search for the Pieces of Eden under the guise of creating entertainment products. In Black Flag, the player assumes the role of an unnamed Abstergo employee tasked with scanning the memories of Edward Kenway, a privateer-turned-pirate during the Golden Age of Piracy and Connor's grandfather. During their investigation, the player is blackmailed into helping a fellow employee, John Standish, recover sensitive information and deliver it to the Assassins. John is later revealed to be a Sage, a human reincarnation of Juno's husband Aita, who is trying to resurrect her, though he is killed by Abstergo before his plan can come to fruition. In Assassin's Creed Rogue, the player controls another Abstergo employee who is recruited by the Templars to clean their servers after the Assassins breach them and recover data on the life of Shay Patrick Cormac, an Assassin-turned-Templar from the 18th century. The Assassins are ultimately forced to go underground once more, and the player character is invited to join the Templars.

By the time of Assassin's Creed Unity, Abstergo distributes its Animus product via a video game console named Helix, tapping into an extensive, unaware player base to help them locate more Pieces of Eden and determine the fates of various Sages as part of the Phoenix Project, an attempt to recreate the genetic structure of the Isu. The Assassins locate select players and bring them in as Initiates to help their cause. In Unity, the player character is contacted by an Assassin named Bishop and asked to experience the memories of Arno Dorian, an Assassin active during the French Revolution, so that the modern-day Assassins can locate the body of a Sage and hide it from Abstergo. Despite the Assassins' efforts, Abstergo collects enough samples of other Sages by the start of Assassin's Creed Syndicate to move forward with the Phoenix Project. Again, Bishop contacts the Initiate and asks them to explore the memories of Jacob and Evie Frye, twin Assassins from Victorian England, to locate a Piece of Eden known as the Shroud, which Abstergo needs to complete the process of recreating the Isu genetic structure. Although the Initiate manages to locate the Shroud, the Templars beat the Assassins to it.

A new storyline is introduced in Assassin's Creed Origins focusing on Abstergo researcher Layla Hassan. Initially tasked with locating historical artifacts in Egypt, Layla stumbles upon the mummified corpses of the medjay Bayek and his wife Aya, co-founders of the Hidden Ones, the precursor organization to the Assassin Brotherhood. Against Abstergo's orders, Layla uses the Animus to relive Bayek's and Aya's memories, making her a target for the Templars, before being met by William Miles, who recruits her to the Assassins. In Assassin's Creed Odyssey, Layla recovers the Spear of Leonidas, extracting the DNA of Leonidas' grandchildren, Alexios and Kassandra. Through their memories, Layla locates the Staff of Hermes Trismegistus, another Piece of Eden, which is guarded by one of the siblings (canonically Kassandra), still alive due to being sustained by the Staff. Kassandra relinquishes the Staff to Layla, who is prophesied to one day restore balance to the world, and who proves herself to be worthy of wielding the Staff. In Assassin's Creed Valhalla, Earth is facing yet another disaster, as its magnetic field has been continually strengthening since Desmond activated the Eye in 2012. Layla exhumes the remains of Eivor Varinsdottir, a 9th-century Viking raider, and from her memories, she learns of an Isu temple in Norway. Layla travels to the temple, using the Staff to protect herself from the radiation inside, and enters the Grey, a virtual world created by the Isu, where she meets both the Reader (implied to be Desmond's preserved consciousness) and Basim Ibn Ishaq, a Hidden One and Sage (the reincarnation of the Isu Loki) who was trapped in the Grey by Eivor. Basim helps Layla stop the disaster before escaping back to reality, where he uses the Staff to rejuvenate himself and meets the other modern-day Assassins.

Release history
The following table lists the main and spin-off games of the franchise, along with their release years and the respective platform(s) they released on:

Released under the title Assassin's Creed: Liberation HD for Windows, PlayStation 3 and Xbox 360 in 2014.
Originally released as DLC for all versions of Assassin's Creed IV: Black Flag in 2013.
Originally announced as part of the season pass for Assassin's Creed Unity.
Released as a compilation titled Assassin's Creed Chronicles Trilogy Pack.
Originally released in New Zealand and Australia in 2014.
Released exclusively for the Honor 9 smartphone.

Main series

Assassin's Creed

The first game in the series was released in November 2007 for the PlayStation 3 and Xbox 360, and in April 2008 for Microsoft Windows. It features a historical recreation of the Holy Land (primarily the cities of Masyaf, Jerusalem, Acre, and Damascus) in the late 12th century. Its narrative includes real historical figures and events from that time period. The storyline consists of two portions: one set during the modern-day, which follows Desmond Miles; and one set in 1191, which follows Desmond's ancestor, Altaïr Ibn-LaʼAhad, a member of the Assassin Order during the time of the Third Crusade. Desmond's story begins with his abduction by pharmaceutical company Abstergo Industries, whose lead scientist, Dr. Warren Vidic, forces him to explore Altaïr's memories through a machine called the Animus that allows him to connect with his ancestors' DNA. In doing so, Abstergo hopes to find powerful artifacts called Pieces of Eden, which the Assassins and their rivals, the Knights Templar, have fought over for centuries. Altaïr's story begins with his demotion to the rank of Novice Assassin after he botches an attempt by the Assassins to recover a Piece of Eden, the Apple of Eden, from the Templars. To redeem himself, Altaïr is tasked with assassinating nine Templar targets across the Holy Land.

Assassin's Creed introduced core elements that remained in the rest of the series. Players can freely explore the game's open world, making use of Altaïr's parkour and climbing skills to navigate the environment. The game also features refined hack-and-slash combat, with players able to block and counter-attacks, and stealth mechanics, such as hiding in crowds of people, which allow players to avoid detection by enemies or lose pursuing foes. Although players can choose the order in which they kill their main targets, the mission design was seen as linear and repetitive because players had to complete several side quests before each assassination. The side quest prerequisite was one of the most criticized aspects of the game, so it was abandoned in future games.

Assassin's Creed II

Assassin's Creed II is a direct sequel to the first game and was released in November 2009 for the PlayStation 3 and Xbox 360, in March 2010 for Windows, and in October 2010 for OS X. The modern-day narrative again follows Desmond, who escapes from Abstergo (revealed at the end of the previous game as a front for the modern-day Templars) with the aid of Assassin mole Lucy Stillman and is taken to her team's hideout. Hoping to train Desmond as an Assassin, they put him in the Animus 2.0, where he begins to suffer from the bleeding effect; this allows Desmond to gain his ancestors' skills, but it also damages his mind, as he begins to involuntarily experience flashes of his ancestors' memories outside of the Animus. Meanwhile, the main narrative takes place at the height of the Italian Renaissance in the late 15th century and follows Desmond's Italian ancestor Ezio Auditore da Firenze, a young nobleman from Florence who is forced to become an Assassin after his father and brothers are killed by the Templars. During his journey to avenge their deaths, Ezio makes allies such as Leonardo da Vinci and Caterina Sforza and combats enemies such as the Pazzi and Barbarigo families and Rodrigo Borgia. Ezio also comes into contact with technology left behind by the First Civilization, a race that created humanity and the Pieces of Eden and who were wiped out by a catastrophic event.

Similar to the first game, Assassin's Creed II incorporates historical events into its narrative and features recreations of several cities from the time period it is set in (in this case, Florence, Venice, Forlì, San Gimignano, and Monteriggioni). Missions are divided into main story missions, themselves into memory sequences reflecting points in Ezio's life, and side missions that can be accomplished at any time; this approach to mission structure remains consistent in the other games in the series. The Villa Auditore in Monteriggioni, which acts as the Assassins' headquarters for most of the game, provides several functions that can be expanded on by paying for upgrades of surrounding buildings, or by purchasing artwork, weapons, and armor for the villa; in turn, the villa will generate wealth for the player at a rate influenced by the upgrades and acquisition of these items.

Assassin's Creed: Brotherhood

Assassin's Creed Brotherhood is the sequel to Assassin's Creed II, and was released in November 2010 for the PlayStation 3 and Xbox 360, in March 2011 for Windows, and in May 2011 for OS X. The game begins immediately after the events of its predecessor, at the end of which Desmond was warned by Minerva, a member of the First Civilization, about a solar flare that will hit the Earth and kill humans in a few months. Desmond and his team travel to Monteriggioni, where they set up a new base and use the Animus to find the Temple of Juno, another First Civilization member, which houses Ezio's own Apple of Eden and the key to stopping the solar flare. The main narrative continues the story of Ezio, who travels to Rome, the center of Templar power in Italy, to re-establish the Assassin Brotherhood there and defeat the Borgias, who have attacked Monteriggioni and stolen the Apple of Eden.

Brotherhood shares many of the same features as the previous game though it takes place primarily in one city: Rome. Like the Villa Auditore, the player can spend money to buy and upgrade shops and other facilities throughout the city to increase the revenue they can collect from it; however, the player will be required to destroy Borgia towers that control various sections of the city before they can do so. The Brotherhood of Assassins is introduced, by which, after saving citizens from certain events, the player can recruit these citizens as Assassins; they can then be dispatched to remote locations across Europe to gain experience and money or can be called in to help the player directly in a mission. For the first time in the series, the game features online multiplayer, in which players assume the role of Abstergo employees who, through the use of the Animus, relive the genetic memories of Renaissance Templars in various game modes. It was the last game to feature Assassin's Creed creator Patrice Désilets, as the creative director of the series.

Assassin's Creed: Revelations

Assassin's Creed: Revelations is the final installment of the Ezio Trilogy and was released in November 2011 for the PlayStation 3, Xbox 360, and Windows. Following the events of Brotherhood, where he was possessed by Juno and forced to kill Lucy (who, unbeknownst to him, was a Templar double agent), Desmond has fallen into a coma and was put back into the Animus to save his mind. Within the computerized core of the Animus, Desmond meets the preserved consciousness of Abstergo's previous Animus test subject, Clay Kaczmarek, who explains that Demond's mind must achieve full synchronization with Altaïr and Ezio, or else he will fall into dementia. Desmond continues exploring the memories of Ezio, who, a few years after the events of Brotherhood, travels to Constantinople to find five keys needed to open a library built by Altaïr, which is said to contain the power to end the Assassin–Templar conflict. In Constantinople, Ezio becomes caught in a war of succession between Sultan Bayezid II's sons, Selim and Ahmet, and must confront a conspiracy masterminded by the Byzantine Templars, who are taking advantage of the chaos to try and reclaim the city, as well as acquire the keys to Altaïr's library themselves.

Originally Revelations was announced as Assassin's Creed: Lost Legacy, and conceptualized as a Nintendo 3DS title focusing on Ezio traveling to Masyaf to explore Altaïr's legacy and uncover the origins of the Assassin Brotherhood. Lost Legacy was later announced as cancelled on July 15, 2011, after Ubisoft decided to expand the idea further, cancel the 3DS development and shift all development duties towards PlayStation 3, Xbox 360 and PC to release the game as a full-fledged main installment of the franchise. The original premise remained and evolved into the plot seen in the final game. Included were many new systems and additional weapons such as bomb-crafting and an expanded Assassin recruitment system. The multiplayer mode returns in Revelations, with more characters, modes, and maps; players once again assume the role of Templars in training and as they level up and rise in the ranks, they are told more about Abstergo's history.

Assassin's Creed III

Assassin's Creed III was released in October 2012 for the PlayStation 3 and Xbox 360 and in November 2012 for Wii U and Windows. A remastered version of the game with enhanced visuals was released for Windows, PlayStation 4, and Xbox One in March 2019 and for Nintendo Switch in May 2019. This is the final game in the series to follow Desmond, who travels to the First Civilization's Central Temple in New York with his friends and father to use the technology inside to prevent the solar flare set to hit the Earth in less than a month. To access this technology, Desmond must undertake several missions across the globe to retrieve 'batteries' to power the Temple, as well as an ancient key to the Temple's inner chambers. To find the latter, Desmond uses the Animus to relive the memories of two of his ancestors who were in possession of the key at various points in time: Haytham Kenway, a British Templar from the 18th century who travels to the American colonies to establish a strong Templar presence on the continent and find the Central Temple; and Ratonhnhaké:ton (later known as Connor), Haytham's half-Mohawk son, who becomes an Assassin to exact revenge on the Templars, whom he blames for the destruction of his village and the death of his mother in his youth. To this end, Connor later becomes involved in the American Revolution, helping the Patriot cause in exchange for their help in hunting down Haytham's faction of Templars, who hope to use the Revolution to further their own goals.

Assassin's Creed III is structured similarly to the previous games, with missions taking place in an open-world map based on Colonial Boston and New York. The game offers a large wilderness area in the form of the Frontier and the Davenport Homestead, where the player can hunt animals for materials, which subsequently can be used to construct goods to be traded and sold throughout the colonies. Naval battles also debut in the series, wherein the player must steer a warship named the Aquila in dangerous waters and perform ship-to-ship combat with cannons and mounted guns. The multiplayer mode from the previous two games returns in Assassin's Creed III with new game modes, characters, and maps inspired by Colonial America, but this time no major narrative elements are included.

Assassin's Creed IV: Black Flag

Assassin's Creed IV: Black Flag was released in October 2013 for the PlayStation 3, Xbox 360, and Wii U and in November 2013 for the PlayStation 4, Xbox One, and Windows. Following the events of Assassin's Creed III, at the end of which Desmond sacrificed himself to save the Earth, Abstergo retrieved samples from his body to continue exploring the memories of his ancestors. The player character is an unnamed Abstergo employee tasked with analyzing the memories of Edward Kenway, a famous 18th-century pirate and Connor's grandfather, ostensibly to gather material for an Animus-powered interactive feature film; in reality, Abstergo are searching for the Observatory, a First Civilization structure that allows the user to see through the eyes of a subject to find them anywhere on the planet. As Edward, the player must unravel a conspiracy between high-ranking Templars to manipulate the British and Spanish empires into locating the Sage — later identified as Bartholomew Roberts — who is the only man that can lead them to the Observatory.

Black Flag retains many gameplay mechanics from Assassin's Creed III, including the ship-based exploration and combat. For the first time in the series, naval exploration is a major part of the game; players can captain Edward's ship, the Jackdaw, and battle rival ships or hunt sea animals. The game includes a large open world spanning the West Indies, with players able to explore the cities of Havana, Nassau, and Kingston, as well as numerous islands, forts, and sunken ships. A multiplayer mode is once again included, although it is entirely land-based.

Assassin's Creed Rogue

Assassin's Creed Rogue is the final game in the series to be developed for the seventh generation of consoles, being released for the PlayStation 3 and Xbox 360 in November 2014, and for Windows in March 2015. A remastered version of the game was released for the PlayStation 4 and Xbox One in March 2018. In the present day, players again take on the role of an unnamed Abstergo employee, tasked with researching the memories of Shay Patrick Cormac, an Assassin from the 18th century who, for reasons unknown to Abstergo, defected to the Templar cause. During their investigation, the player accidentally trips a hidden memory file that infects the Animus servers. They must complete Shay's memories to clean the servers while Abstergo is put in lockdown. The main narrative takes place during the Seven Years' War, and follows Shay, who starts out as a talented, but insubordinate Assassin trainee. After witnessing the Assassins' hypocrisy and willingness to sacrifice civilians in their blind pursuit of the Pieces of Eden, Shay betrays them and joins the Templar Order, helping his newfound allies hunt down members of his former Brotherhood to prevent them from endangering more innocent lives. Shay's story is set between the events of Assassin's Creed IV: Black Flag and Assassin's Creed III, and is meant to fill the gaps between their respective narratives, while also having "a crucial link to the Kenway saga" according to Ubisoft, as well as to Assassin's Creed Unity. Several major characters from III and Black Flag make appearances in the game, such as Haytham Kenway, Achilles Davenport, and Adéwalé.

In March 2014, a new Assassin's Creed game code-named Comet was revealed to be in development for the PlayStation 3 and Xbox 360, set to release later that year alongside Unity. By the end of the month, additional reports indicated that Comet would be set around 1758 New York City, and would feature sailing on the Atlantic Ocean. The game would be a direct sequel to Black Flag, and would be the first to feature a Templar as the main protagonist. In May 2014, Guillemot stated that, "for the foreseeable future", Assassin's Creed games would continue releasing on the last generation PlayStation 3 and Xbox 360, despite the franchise moving to the current generation PlayStation 4 and Xbox One with Unity. On August 5, Ubisoft officially announced the game as Assassin's Creed Rogue. While the game reuses many assets from Black Flag, a number of new systems and weapons were included, such as an air rifle and refined naval combat, and the multiplayer aspect has been removed.

Assassin's Creed Unity

Assassin's Creed Unity was released concurrently with Rogue in November 2014 for the PlayStation 4, Xbox One, Windows, and Google Stadia. In the present-day, the player character is a player of Helix, an Animus-powered gaming device produced by Abstergo, who hope to use their unaware player base to locate more Pieces of Eden. While playing, the player is contacted by the modern-day Assassins and invited to join them as an Initiate and help them locate the body of an 18th-century Sage. The main story is set in Paris during the French Revolution, and follows Assassin Arno Dorian as he attempts to avenge his foster father's death at the hands of the Templars, which leads him to discover an internal conflict between the Templars as a result of the Revolution.

On March 19, 2014, images leaked for the next Assassin's Creed game, titled or code-named Unity, showing a new assassin in Paris. On March 21, Ubisoft confirmed the game's existence, having been in development for more than three years, by releasing pre-alpha game footage. The game features enhanced visuals compared to its predecessors, and several new gameplay mechanics, including a four player co-op mode, a first for the series.

Assassin's Creed Syndicate

Assassin's Creed Syndicate was released in October 2015 for the PlayStation 4 and Xbox One, in November 2015 for Windows, and in December 2020 for the Stadia. In the present-day, players control the same unnamed Assassin Initiate from Assassin's Creed Unity, who, this time must help the Assassins find a powerful artifact, the Shroud of Eden, hidden somewhere in London. The main story is set in Victorian era London and follows twin assassins Jacob and Evie Frye, as they navigate the corridors of organized crime to take back the city from Templar control and prevent them from finding the Shroud. The narrative also includes segments set in war-torn London during World War I, which follow Jacob's granddaughter, Lydia Frye, as she battles German soldiers and Templar spies and searches for a Sage.

In December 2014, images and information leaked for a new Assassin's Creed game, titled or code-named Victory, which was later confirmed by Ubisoft. In May 2015, Kotaku leaked that Victory had been renamed Syndicate. On May 12, 2015, the game was officially announced by Ubisoft. The game retains most gameplay elements from Unity, while introducing new travelling systems, such as carriages and a grappling hook, and refined combat mechanics. It is the first game in the series to feature multiple playable protagonists, whom the player can switch between both during and outside missions.

Assassin's Creed Origins

Assassin's Creed Origins is a soft reboot of the franchise, and was released in October 2017 for the PlayStation 4, Xbox One, Windows, and Stadia. The game introduces a new protagonist in the modern-day, Layla Hassan, and explores the origins of the Assassin Brotherhood and their conflict with the Templar Order. The story is set in Ancient Egypt, near the end of the Ptolemaic period (49–43 BC), and follows a medjay named Bayek and his wife Aya, whose fight to protect their people from the Order of the Ancients—forerunners to the Templar Order—leads them to create the Hidden Ones—forerunners to the Assassin Brotherhood. Unlike previous games in the series, which were more action-adventure game-oriented, Origins heavily features mechanics found in action role-playing games, including an overhauled hitbox-based combat system.

In February 2016, Ubisoft announced they would not be releasing a new game in 2016 in order to step "back and [re-examine] the Assassin's Creed franchise ... [and take the] year to evolve the game mechanics and to make sure we're delivering on the promise of Assassin's Creed offering unique and memorable gameplay experiences." On the decision, Guillemot said that "Ubisoft started to question the annualized franchise with the release of Assassin's Creed Unity, and the fact that Assassin's Creed Syndicate had "a slower launch than expected". Guillemot added that "by moving away from the annual iterations of the franchise, it will give the Assassin's Creed teams more time to take advantage of new engines and technology." Assassin's Creed IV: Black Flags director Ashraf Ismail, commented on an interview that he and the team would be interested in doing an Assassin's Creed game in an Ancient Egyptian setting, along with reiterating an earlier statement that a female leading character was not an impossibility for the series. In May 2017, Ubisoft confirmed the development of Assassin's Creed Origins; one month later, the setting was confirmed to be Ptolemaic Egypt.

Assassin's Creed Odyssey

Assassin's Creed Odyssey was released in October 2018 for the PlayStation 4, Xbox One, Windows, and Nintendo Switch, and in November 2019 for the Stadia. The modern-day narrative continues from the events of Origins, as Layla, after being recruited to the Assassins, searches for Atlantis, which is rumored to house a powerful artifact: the Staff of Hermes. The main story is set during the Peloponnesian War between Athens and Sparta, at the height of Classical Greece. Players choose between two playable protagonists, Alexios and Kassandra, and embark on a quest to discover mysteries surrounding their family, as well as to undermine a proto-Templar organization: the Cult of Kosmos.

Odyssey was leaked in May 2018 by a picture posted by the French website Jeuxvideo; it was officially announced at E3 2018, with a release date of October 2018. Similarly to Origins, the game places more emphasis on role-playing elements than previous entries in the series and introduces dialogue options and branching quests, which can result in different endings.

Assassin's Creed Valhalla

Assassin's Creed Valhalla was released in November 2020 for the PlayStation 4, PlayStation 5, Xbox One, Xbox Series X/S, Windows, Stadia, and Amazon Luna. The game concludes the modern-day story arc focusing on Layla, who must find a First Civilization temple in Norway to restore the Earth's magnetic field to its proper strength since Desmond's sacrifice in Assassin's Creed III only delayed the apocalypse. The main narrative takes place in the late 9th century, during the Viking expansions into the British Isles. Players control a customizable Viking raider, Eivor Varinsdottir, who becomes embroiled in the conflict between the Hidden Ones and the Order of the Ancients while attempting to establish a new Viking clan in England.

Valhalla was officially announced in April 2020. Ubisoft Montreal led its development along with fourteen other Ubisoft studios. The title had been leaked earlier in April 2019 under the name Assassin's Creed Kingdom. Like its predecessors, Valhalla is a role-playing game focused on combat and exploration, although it brings back several elements that were absent in Origins and Odyssey, such as social stealth and a customizable settlement.

Spin-offs

Assassin's Creed III: Liberation

Assassin's Creed III: Liberation is a spin-off to Assassin's Creed III, originally released for the PlayStation Vita in October 2012. The story takes place before and during the events of Assassin's Creed III, and follows Aveline de Grandpré, a Louisiana Creole woman from New Orleans, the daughter of a French merchant father and an African mother. Aveline is recruited into the Assassin Brotherhood by a former slave and fights against slavery as well as the Templars, who plot to take over Louisiana after the end of the Seven Years' War. Aveline uses a variety of new weapons in combat, including a machete and a blowpipe for ranged attacks, and can disguise herself to deceive enemies, although certain disguises limit her movement and abilities. The entire game is presented as a product developed by the in-universe company Abstergo Entertainment, who have done a heavy amount of censoring in regards to the Assassin–Templar conflict. At various points during their playthrough, the player is contacted by the hacking collective Erudito, who helps them uncensor the game to learn the true nature of the events depicted.

An original Assassin's Creed title for the PlayStation Vita was announced to be in development during Gamescom 2011 and would feature a new story with new characters; on June 4, 2012, at E3, Liberation was officially announced. On September 10, 2013, it was announced that the game would be re-released as Assassin's Creed: Liberation HD for PlayStation 3, Xbox 360, and Microsoft Windows via the PlayStation Network, Xbox Live Arcade, and Steam, respectively. In March 2019, it was announced that a remastered version of Liberation would be bundled with Assassin's Creed III Remastered for Windows, PlayStation 4, Xbox One and, later, for the Nintendo Switch. Ubisoft officially decommissioned Assassin's Creed: Liberation HD on October 1, 2022, with no additional copies being sold outside of the bundled Assassin's Creed III Remastered version.

Assassin's Creed: Freedom Cry 

Assassin's Creed Freedom Cry was originally released as downloadable content (DLC) for most versions of Assassin's Creed IV: Black Flag in December 2013. A standalone version was released in February 2014 for Microsoft Windows, PlayStation 3, and PlayStation 4. Set thirteen years after the ending of Black Flag, the game follows Adéwalé, a major supporting character from Black Flag, who served as the quartermaster to protagonist Edward Kenway before joining the Assassin Brotherhood towards the end of the main story. During the events of Freedom Cry, Adéwalé finds himself shipwrecked in the French colony of Saint-Domingue (present-day Haiti), where he encounters some of the most brutal slavery practices in the West Indies. Being a former slave, Adéwalé temporarily abandons his fight against the Templars and joins a Maroon rebellion to help them rescue oppressed slaves.

Being originally released as DLC for Black Flag, Freedom Cry's gameplay is virtually identical, though it does feature several new additions. Most notably, Adéwalé has the option to rescue slaves by raiding plantations, attacking slave ships, or simply killing their masters, with each freed slave serving as a resource for the player to accumulate to unlock upgrades for Adéwalé. Furthermore, some freed slaves join the Maroon rebellion and can become crew members aboard Adéwalé's ship, the Experto Crede, or help the player fight enemies.

Assassin's Creed Chronicles

Assassin's Creed Chronicles is sub-series of three 2.5D action and stealth games released for Microsoft Windows, PlayStation 4, PlayStation Vita, and Xbox One.

The first game, Assassin's Creed Chronicles: China, was originally released as part of Assassin's Creed Unitys season pass on April 21, 2015, but it was later made available for purchase separately. Set after the short film Assassin's Creed: Embers, the game follows Shao Jun in Imperial China from 1526 to 1532, as she battles the Templar group Eight Tigers and attempts to rebuild the Chinese Assassin Brotherhood.
The second game, Assassin's Creed Chronicles: India, was released on January 12, 2016. It is set in British India in 1841, two years after the events of the graphic novel Assassin's Creed: Brahman. The game follows Arbaaz Mir, who, while attempting to recover a Precursor artifact from the Templars, becomes caught in a war between the Sikh Empire and the East India Company and must protect his friends and lover.
The last game, Assassin's Creed Chronicles: Russia, was released on February 9, 2016. It is set in Soviet Russia in 1918, in the aftermath of the October Revolution, and bridges the gap between the comic book Assassin's Creed: The Fall and its graphic novel sequel, Assassin's Creed: The Chain. The game follows Nikolai Orelov as he attempts to protect a Precursor artifact and Grand Duchess Anastasia from the Templars and the Bolsheviks after witnessing the execution of the Romanov family.

Handheld and mobile games

Assassin's Creed: Altaïr's Chronicles

Assassin's Creed: Altaïr's Chronicles is a spin-off for the Nintendo DS, Windows Phone, Android, iOS, webOS, Symbian, and Java ME, originally released in February 2008. The game is a prequel to the first Assassin's Creed, taking place in the year 1190, and follows Altaïr as he attempts to retrieve an artifact called the Chalice from the Templars.

Assassin's Creed: Bloodlines

Assassin's Creed: Bloodlines is the second spin-off title following Altaïr. It was released as a PlayStation Portable exclusive in November 2009 (concurrently with Assassin's Creed II) and acts as a direct sequel to the original game. Following the events of Assassin's Creed, Altaïr travels to the island nation of Cyprus to eliminate the last remnants of the Templar Order. Here, he again runs into Maria Thorpe, a young Templar agent whose life he spared in the first game, and they team up to eliminate the Templar presence on the island and learn more about the Apple of Eden and the mysterious Templar Archive, where more Pieces of Eden are believed to be hidden. Despite the technical limitations of the PlayStation Portable, the game features most gameplay mechanics of the console and PC titles, and even a few exclusive elements.

Assassin's Creed II: Discovery

Assassin's Creed II: Discovery is a spin-off to Assassin's Creed II and was released alongside it in November 2009 for the Nintendo DS; it was later re-released for iOS in January 2010. The game is a 2.5D side-scroller, and takes place during the events of Assassin's Creed II, between Sequences 12 and 13 when Ezio is searching for the Apple of Eden after losing it to Girolamo Savonarola. During his search, Ezio travels to Spain to rescue members of the Spanish Assassin Brotherhood who have been arrested on the orders of Tomás de Torquemada, the Grand Inquisitor of the Spanish Inquisition, and allies with several historical figures, such as Luis de Santángel and Christopher Columbus.

Assassin's Creed: Multiplayer Rearmed 
Assassin's Creed: Multiplayer Rearmed is a multiplayer video game designed for iOS, and released for the iPad, iPhone, and iPod Touch in October 2011. It is the only Assassin's Creed multiplayer game driven by an in-game economy. The aim of the game is to assassinate the assigned targets while avoiding being killed by a hunter. The player can purchase additional items, characters and abilities as well as compete with friends and foes from around the globe in a four player real-time online multiplayer mode. Players can connect via Game Center. It is also possible to play against someone in the immediate area via Bluetooth. Available map locations include Jerusalem, San Donato, Venice and Alhambra.

Assassin's Creed: Recollection
Assassin's Creed: Recollection is a real-time board game designed for iOS. It was initially released for the iPad in December 2011, and later for the iPhone and iPod Touch in March 2012. In the game, players go head-to-head in real-time political battles with different characters from the main games of the series across 280+ memories. The single-player campaign is estimated to provide 10+ hours of gameplay, with 20 missions from Barcelona to Constantinople and 10 bonus challenge missions. The game also features a Versus Mode, in which players can challenge their friends and or other people worldwide, as well as a collection of various artwork from the franchise.

Assassin's Creed: Pirates
Assassin's Creed: Pirates is a mobile game released on iOS and Android devices on December 5, 2013. Developed by Ubisoft Paris, the game follows Captain Alonzo Batilla, who is neither Assassin nor Templar, as he commands a ship and crew, while crossing paths with the Assassins and Templars. Gameplay focuses on real-time battles between ships. The title is rendered in 3D and features both wind and weather that will affect how players proceed.

Assassin's Creed Memories
Assassin's Creed Memories is a mobile game that was released on iOS devices on August 20, 2014. Developed along with PlayNext and Gree, the game combines card collection and battling, target chasing, and strategy elements, along with the option of competitive multiplayer. Additional multiplayer options include allowing players to join a guild and engage in 20 vs. 20 guild combat scenarios. Memories features different historical eras, including the Third Crusade, the Golden Age of Piracy, feudal Japan and the Mongolian Empire.

Assassin's Creed Identity

Assassin's Creed Identity is a third-person role-playing video game for iOS and Android devices that was released worldwide on February 25, 2016, following a soft-launch in Australia and New Zealand in 2014. It is the first mobile game in the series to feature a fully explorable 3D environment, and takes place alongside the events of Assassin's Creed: Brotherhood. In Identity, players create their own custom Assassin and complete missions for the Brotherhood in Italy, while interacting with various characters from the mainline games, like Ezio Auditore and Niccolò Machiavelli.

Assassin's Creed Unity: Arno's Chronicles 
Assassin's Creed Unity: Arno's Chronicles is a side-scrolling mobile game released for the Huawei Honor smartphone series in June 2017. It features a similar gameplay style to the Assassin's Creed Chronicles games, and roughly adapts the events of Assassin's Creed Unity's main storyline.

Assassin's Creed Rebellion
Assassin's Creed Rebellion is a free-to-play, strategy role-playing game for iOS and Android devices that was released worldwide on November 21, 2018. Set during the Spanish Inquisition in the late 15th century, it follows the Spanish Assassins under Aguilar de Nerha as they attempt to build their own Brotherhood to overthrow the Spanish Templars. The game features a large cast of characters from the entire Assassin's Creed franchise, as well as thirty new characters created exclusively for Rebellion.

Cancelled and defunct mobile games

 Assassin's Creed: Project Legacy was a single-player browser-based, role-playing video game Facebook application designed as a promotion and tie-in for Assassin's Creed: Brotherhood. The game is mostly text-based but includes graphics and sound as well as some video. The game was put on indefinite hold in 2011 and later removed by Facebook on 15 May 2013.
 Assassin's Creed: Utopia is a cancelled mobile game that was planned to be available on Android and iOS devices. The game's story would have led into Assassin's Creed III, though there would have been no links in terms of gameplay. Utopia would have taken place in the 17th century, at the beginning of the colonization of North America. Gameplay would have spanned 150 years of history to help players, in the words of Tom Phillips from Eurogamer, "discover how the Assassins influenced history and helped shape the nation's original thirteen colonies". The gameplay involved building a colonial city, and was planned to have more of a social slant than any of the earlier games. The Assassins of each colony would have taken on their enemies in limited-time epic battles, and players would have been able to pit their strength against friends in asynchronous 3D brawls.

Re-release compilations  and collections
 Assassin's Creed: Ezio Trilogy: Compilation of Assassin's Creed II, Assassin's Creed: Brotherhood, and Assassin's Creed: Revelations. It was released for the PlayStation 3 and Xbox 360 on November 13, 2012.
 Assassin's Creed: Heritage Collection: Compilation of the first five games of the main series into one collection, featuring Assassin's Creed, Assassin's Creed II, Assassin's Creed: Brotherhood, Assassin's Creed: Revelations, and Assassin's Creed III. It was released for Microsoft Windows, PlayStation 3, and Xbox 360 on November 8, 2013.
 Assassin's Creed: The Americas Collection (American title) / Assassin's Creed: Birth of a New World – The American Saga (European title): Developed by Ubisoft Montreal, features Assassin's Creed III, Assassin's Creed: Liberation HD and Assassin's Creed IV: Black Flag. It was released for Windows, PlayStation 3, and Xbox 360 on October 3, 2014, in Europe and October 28, 2014, in North America. The Windows version is exclusive to Europe.
 Assassin's Creed: The Ezio Collection: Developed by Virtuos and Ubisoft Montreal, features remastered versions of Assassin's Creed II, Assassin's Creed: Brotherhood, and Assassin's Creed: Revelations for the PlayStation 4 and Xbox One. The games feature improved graphics, lighting, effects, and textures, and also include all previously released downloadable content for the single-player. In addition, the bundle features the short films Assassin's Creed: Embers and Assassin's Creed: Lineage. The collection was released on November 15, 2016, to mixed reviews, being generally criticized for its minimal graphical enhancements, the gameplay for feeling dated, the capped 30 frames per second, and the absence of the multiplayer game modes in Brotherhood and Revelations. A Nintendo Switch version was released in February 2022.
 Assassin's Creed: Rebel Collection: Contains Assassin's Creed IV: Black Flag and the remastered version of Assassin's Creed Rogue, along with all previously released downloadable content. It was released on December 6, 2019, for the Nintendo Switch.

Future games
Asked about the future of the series in 2009, Sébastien Puel from Ubisoft said that "we could do 35 of these [Assassin's Creed games]", while Laurent Detoc later said "we hope to reach Assassin's Creed 10."

In November 2011, a Ubisoft survey was sent out, asking participants which locations and time periods they would like to see in the "next Assassin's Creed games". These settings were Medieval China, Victorian England, Ancient Egypt, the Portuguese and/or Spanish colonizationns of the Americas, the American Revolution, the Russian Revolution, Feudal Japan, and Ancient Rome. Alex Hutchinson, creative director of Assassin's Creed III, suggested the most requested Assassin's Creed settings, World War II, Feudal Japan and Ancient Egypt, are "the three worst settings for an Assassin's Creed game". Hutchinson also stated both he and Corey May were open to the idea of a future entry set during the time of the British Raj, which now consists of the modern states of Bangladesh, Pakistan, Myanmar, and India. Victorian England, the American Revolution, Medieval China, parts of the British Raj, the Russian Revolution, and Ancient Egypt were subsequently used for Assassin's Creed Syndicate, Assassin's Creed III, Assassin's Creed Chronicles, and Assassin's Creed Origins, respectively, with World War I appearing as a section of Syndicate, World War II as an easter egg in Unity, and part of Ancient Rome appearing briefly in Origins. Feudal Japan is expected to be the setting of an upcoming game, Assassin's Creed: Codename Red.

Assassin's Creed Mirage 

Assassin's Creed Mirage is an upcoming game for Windows, PlayStation 4, PlayStation 5, Xbox One, Xbox Series X/S, and Luna, expected to release in 2023. Set in Baghdad during the Islamic Golden Age, it will follow the character Basim Ibn Ishaq, introduced in Assassin's Creed Valhalla, and his transition from street thief to Hidden One, a few decades before the events of Valhalla. The game also intends to return to the series' roots by focusing on stealth, parkour, and assassinations over the role-playing elements featured heavily in recent installments.

In early 2022, it was reported that a new Assassin's Creed game, titled or code-named Rift, was in development and expected to launch in late 2022 or early 2023. According to various leaks and reports, the game started out as an expansion for Valhalla starring Basim and was intended to be more akin to older games in the series, featuring a smaller setting and a bigger focus on stealth gameplay. The game was officially confirmed by Ubisoft as Assassin's Creed Mirage on September 1, 2022, followed by a full announcement during the Ubisoft Forward online event on September 10.

Assassin's Creed: Codename Jade 
Assassin's Creed: Codename Jade is an upcoming title for mobile devices. Set in Ancient China during the Qin dynasty in the 3rd century BC, the game will allow players to create their own custom character and will feature the same style of gameplay as the main console and PC releases.

Assassin's Creed Infinity
Following another round of sexual misconduct allegations and internal investigation across Ubisoft in 2020 and 2021, which saw the departure of many top-level executives as well as attrition from its studios, Ubisoft opted to merge operations of the Montreal and Quebec studios under one administrative body in April 2021, with Quebec taking the lead on the Assassin's Creed series. This led to a collaboration to develop the most ambitious game in the series yet, a live-service title codenamed Assassin's Creed Infinity. Infinity will be similar to Fortnite and Grand Theft Auto Online in that it will be more of a service, rather than a game, intended to be an entry point for future Assassin's Creed titles for players as well as to simplify the development of these games across Ubisoft's studios.

Marc-Alexis Côté, from Quebec, will serve as Infinity executive producer. According to Côté, Infinity will be used to present the modern-day setting of the Assassin's Creed games involving the Animus, while each game will be focused on the historical setting. Clint Hocking and Jonathan Dumont will serve as the creative directors, with Dumont and Hocking leading the Quebec and Montreal divisions, respectively. Étienne Allonier and Julien Laferrière, both from Montreal, will serve as brand director and senior producer, respectively.

Assassin's Creed: Codename Red 
Assassin's Creed: Codename Red was announced at Ubisoft Forward in September 2022 as the next major Assassin's Creed game to take place during the Feudal Japan period. Côté said the game will let players live out a "very powerful shinobi fantasy". The title is being helmed by Ubisoft Quebec and will be the first game to be included in Infinity.

Assassin's Creed: Codename Hexe 
Assassin's Creed: Codename Hexe was also announced in September 2022 as the next flagship title in the series, following Codename Red, and the second game to be included in Infinity. Development is being led by Clint Hocking at Ubisoft Montreal. Côté described the title as "a very different type of Assassin's Creed game". While little on its setting was shown in its initial trailer, Bloomberg News reported that the game is set in Central Europe during the 16th century, at the height of the Holy Roman Empire, and will focus on witch hunts and other paranormal fears.

Cancelled games
In September 2020, at the digital event of Facebook Connect, Ubisoft Red Storm Entertainment's VP of Product Development, Elizabeth Loverso, revealed several AAA game franchises coming to virtual reality format to the public. Two of the projects announced were an untitled Assassin's Creed game and an untitled installment from Tom Clancy's Splinter Cell (also developed by Ubisoft), with both titles set to release exclusively for Oculus platforms. This is not the first Assassin's Creed title coming to VR but is the first to be available in public; the Splinter Cell VR game was cancelled on July 21, 2022.

Television 
In November 2016, it was announced that Ubisoft and Netflix started talks regarding how to develop an Assassin's Creed series. In July 2017, Adi Shankar revealed he would be creating the series, which would be in the anime format. The series, which will feature an original story from Shankar, will share the same universe as the other media of the franchise.

A live-action series, an animated series, and an anime series were announced in October 2020 for Netflix. The live-action series would be produced by Ubisoft Film & Television for the streaming service, with Jason Altman and Danielle Kreinik as executive producers and Jeb Stuart as the writer. In January 2023, Collider reported that Stuart was no longer involved with the series.

Film

Theatrical

A live-action film, Assassin's Creed, set in the same universe as the video games and other media, was released on December 21, 2016. Development for the film began in October 2011, when Sony Pictures entered final negotiations with Ubisoft Motion Pictures to make the film. In July 2012, Michael Fassbender was announced to star in the film, as well as co-produce the film. His role was revealed in August 2015 as Callum Lynch, whose ancestor Aguilar, is an Assassin from 15th-century Spain. In October 2012, Ubisoft revealed the film would no longer be produced by Sony Pictures, instead co-produced with New Regency and distributed by 20th Century Fox. In January 2013, Michael Lesslie was hired to write the film, with Scott Frank, Adam Cooper and Bill Collage performing rewrites to the script. By the end of April 2014, Justin Kurzel was in talks to direct. Principal photography began on August 31, 2015, and ended on January 15, 2016. The film was poorly received by critics and performed poorly at the box office, losing an estimated $75 to $100 million and becoming one of the biggest box office bombs of 2016.

Live-action short film

Assassin's Creed: Lineage

Assassin's Creed: Lineage is a 36-minute film made to promote Assassin's Creed II. The film, released in three parts on YouTube across 2009, was the first step by Ubisoft into the film industry. Lineage serves as a prequel to Assassin's Creed II, exploring the life of Ezio's father Giovanni Auditore and his career as an Assassin in 15th-century Italy. Following the mysterious assassination of Duke of Milan, Galeazzo Maria Sforza, in 1476, Giovanni sets out to find those responsible, leading him to uncover a larger conspiracy masterminded by the Templars and their Grand Master, Rodrigo Borgia.

Animated short films

Assassin's Creed: Ascendance
Originally named Secret Project Number Three, Ascendance is an animated short by UbiWorkshop and Ubisoft Montreal, which bridges the gap between Assassin's Creed II and Assassin's Creed: Brotherhood. Set during the events of Brotherhood, it shows Ezio meeting with a hooded man (revealed at the end of the film to be Leonardo da Vinci) to gather information about Cesare Borgia. Most of the film revolves around Cesare's backstory and rise to power in Italy, as narrated by Leonardo to Ezio. The animated short was revealed by UbiWorkshop on November 10, 2010. It was released on November 16, 2010, for Xbox Live, PlayStation Store and iTunes Store.

Assassin's Creed: Embers

Assassin's Creed: Embers is a 21-minute animated film included in the Signature and Collector's Editions of Assassin's Creed: Revelations; it was later re-released on the PlayStation Store in April 2015. The film serves as an epilogue to Ezio's story, depicting the final days of his life after he retired from the Assassin Brotherhood and started a family. When a mysterious Chinese assassin named Shao Jun arrives to seek his help and guidance, Ezio must fight to protect his loved ones one last time.

Print publications

Comic books

Graphic novel series 
A six volume French-language Assassin's Creed graphic novel series, written by Eric Corbeyran and illustrated by Djilalli Defaux, was released by French publisher Lex Deux Royaumes, founded by Ubisoft in 2009 as in-house comic book publishing studio. The novels have also received English-language versions in the United States and the United Kingdom, published by Titan Comics.

Like the games, the series alternates between a modern-day storyline and an Assassin ancestor storyline, and is split into two different arcs, each consisting of three volumes: The Ankh of Isis Trilogy, which follows Desmond Miles and his ancestor Aquilus, a 3rd-century Roman Assassin; and The Hawk Trilogy, which follows Jonathan Hawk and his ancestor Numa Al'Khamsin, a 14th-century Egyptian Assassin. However, the modern-day story has been declared non-canon by Ubisoft, due to directly contradicting elements from the games (such as Subject 16's name being Michael instead of Clay Kaczmarek), while the ancestor story remains of dubious canonicity.

Assassin's Creed Volume 1: Desmond is the first entry in The Ankh of Isis Trilogy, released on November 13, 2009. An English language version was released on October 30, 2012. The story is a retelling of the events from Assassin's Creed and the beginning of Assassin's Creed II, and follows Desmond as he is abducted by Abstergo Industries and forced to relive the memories of three of his ancestors—Aquilus, Altaïr Ibn-LaʼAhad, and Ezio Auditore da Firenze—to further the Templars' goals, before escaping with the help of Lucy Stillman.
Assassin's Creed Volume 2: Aquilus is the second entry in The Ankh of Isis Trilogy, released on November 12, 2010. An English language version was released on October 30, 2012. The story continues from the events of Volume 1, as Desmond and his Assassin team—Lucy, Shaun Hastings, and Rebecca Crane—head to a new hideout in Monteriggioni while avoiding Abstergo agents sent to hunt them down. The novel also continues the story of Aquilus, who comes across a mysterious artifact built by the First Civilization: an ankh which can temporarily revive the dead.
Assassin's Creed, Volume 3: Accipiter is the final entry in The Ankh of Isis Trilogy, released on November 10, 2011. An English language version was released on October 30, 2012. The story continues from the events of Volume 2, and focuses on both Desmond and fellow Assassin Jonathan Hawk as they relive the memories their ancestors, Aquilus and his cousin Accipiter, respectively.
Assassin's Creed, Volume 4: Hawk is the first entry in The Hawk Trilogy, released on November 16, 2012. An English language version was released on November 12, 2013, in the United States and November 15, 2013, in the United Kinggom. The novel continues the story of Jonathan Hawk, introduced in Volume 3, as he relives the memories of his Egyptian ancestor Numa Al'Khamsin, better known as "El Cakr" (English: The Hawk), to locate a powerful artifact known as the Scepter of Aset.
Assassin's Creed, Volume 5: El Cakr is the second entry in The Hawk Trilogy, released on October 31, 2013. An English language version was released on November 18, 2014, in the United States and November 21, 2014, in the United Kingdom. The story continues from the events of Volume 4, as Jonathan unmasks a traitor who infiltrated his Assassin cell, while El Cakr battles the Templars for possession of the Scepter of Aset.
Assassin's Creed, Volume 6: Leila is the final entry in The Hawk Trilogy, released on October 31, 2014. An English language version was released on November 17, 2015, in the United States and November 20, 2015, in the United Kingdom. The novel concludes the stories of both Jonathan, who races against the Templars to retrieve the Scepter of Aset from its last known location, and El Cakr, who encounters a mysterious woman named Leila on his way to deliver the Scepter to the Assassins.

Assassin's Creed: Conspiracies

Assassin's Creed: Conspiracies is a two-part graphic novel series written by Guillaume Dorison and illustrated by Jean-Baptiste Hostache. The two volumes, titled Die Glocke and Project Rainbow, were published by Les Deux Royaumes in French on October 21, 2016, and December 1, 2017, respectively. English-language versions were released by Titan Comics on August 1 and September 5, 2018. Conspiracies is set during World War II, featuring the race for the Atomic Bomb, and follows a new Assassin hero named Eddie Gorm who influences the course of history in 1943.

Assassin's Creed: Bloodstone

Assassin's Creed: Bloodstone is a two-part graphic novel series written by Guillaume Dorison and illustrated by Ennio Bufi. The first volume was published in French by Les Deux Royaumes on March 29, 2019, followed by the second on October 11, 2019. Titan Comics released English-language versions of the two volumes on February 18, 2020, and January 26, 2021, respectively. Bloodstone is set during the Vietnam War in the early 1960s and follows Assassin Alekseï Gavrani, an ex-Soviet hitman-turned-CIA operative. The modern-day storyline continues from the events of Assassin's Creed: Conspiracies, and features Japanese Assassin Tomo Sakagawa reliving Alekseï's memories to locate an Apple of Eden.

Assassin's Creed: The Fall and The Chain

In July 2010, Ubisoft announced a three-part comic book miniseries set in the universe of Assassin's Creed as a part of their UbiWorkshop initiative. Cameron Stewart and Karl Kerschl, both winners of multiple comic book awards, were chosen by Ubisoft to work on the miniseries, titled Assassin's Creed: The Fall. Published by WildStorm, the first issue was released on November 10, 2010, followed by the second on December 1, 2010, and the third on January 12, 2011. The story alternates between the perspectives of Nikolai Orelov, an Assassin in 19th and 20th-century Russia, and his descendant Daniel Cross, a recovering alcoholic with a mysterious past who involuntarily experiences Nikolai's memories.

A graphic novel sequel to The Fall, titled Assassin's Creed: The Chain, was released on August 9, 2012. The book is also written and illustrated by Stewart and Kerschl, and concludes Nikolai's story after his retirement from the Assassin Brotherhood and immigration to the United States.

Assassin's Creed: Brahman

Assassin's Creed: Brahman is a graphic novel written by Brendan Fletcher with art by Cameron Stewart and Karl Kerschl. It was released on October 30, 2013, in North America. The story is set in 19th-century British India, amidst a period of increasing political tensions between the Sikh Empire and the East India Company, and follows Indian Assassin Arbaaz Mir, who attempts to maintain peace and recover the Koh-i-Noor diamond, believed to be a powerful Precursor relic, from the Templars. The modern-day storyline is set in 2013 and follows Arbaaz's descendant, Monima Das, a famous film actress, and her fiancé, Jot Soora, a descendant of Arbaaz's mute servant boy Raza.

Assassin's Creed: Awakening
Assassin's Creed: Awakening is a manga adaptation of Assassin's Creed IV: Black Flag, written by Takashi Yano and illustrated by Kenji Oiwa. It was released from August 2013 to July 2014.

Assassin's Creed: Assassins

Assassin's Creed: Assassins is a comic book series written by Anthony Del Col, illustrated by Connor McCreery, and published by Titan Comics. While it was an ongoing series, it had a planned duration of at least three years, with the first issue being released in October 2015. In October 2016, Titan announced that after its fourteenth issue, Assassins along with its companion series, Templars, would be relaunched with a different creative team as a new title: Assassin's Creed: Uprising.

All issues of the comic follow the adventures of a modern-day Assassin cell, with Charlotte de la Cruz as its central character, who relives memories of her ancestors at various points in history. The first story arc of the series (issues No. 1–5) takes place in the late 17th century, during the Salem witch trials, with the parallel modern-day story featuring an espionage tale. The five issues were later collected and published as a trade paperback, Assassin's Creed Volume 1: Trial by Fire on June 21, 2016. The second story arc (No. 6–10) is set during the Inca Empire in the 16th century, while the parallel modern-day story revolves around the hacking collective Erudito. It was later published as Assassin's Creed Volume 2: Setting Sun on December 6, 2016. The third story arc (No. 11–14) takes place in Florence during the early 16th century, running parallel with a modern-day story again featuring Erudito. It was later published as Assassin's Creed Volume 3: Homecoming on May 23, 2017.

Assassin's Creed: Templars
Assassin's Creed: Templars is a comic book series published by Titan Comics, and a companion series to Assassin's Creed: Assassins. Written by Fred Van Lente and illustrated by Dennis Calero, the series debuted its first issue in March 2016. In October 2016, Titan announced that after its ninth issue, Templars, along with its sister series, would be relaunched with a new creative team as Assassin's Creed: Uprising.

The first story arc of the series (issues No. 1–5) is set in Shanghai in 1927 and follows a Templar known as the Black Cross, with the parallel modern-day story taking place in November 2013. The five issues were later published as Assassin's Creed: Templars – Volume 1: Black Cross on December 6, 2016. The second story arc (issues No. 6–9) has its modern-day story set in 2016, following Juhani Otso Berg and Albert Bolden living through his ancestors' memories in 1805 using the Animus. It was later published as Assassin's Creed: Templars – Volume 2: Cross of War on May 23, 2017.

Assassin's Creed: Uprising
Assassin's Creed: Uprising is a comic book series published by Titan Comics, and the successor to both Assassins and Templars. The comic, which ran for twelve issues from February 2017 to June 2018, is written by Dan Watters and Alex Paknadel and illustrated by José Holder. It was later released as three separate volumes, with Volume 1: Common Ground releasing on August 22, 2017, and comprising issues No. 1–4, Volume 2: Inflection Point releasing on January 30, 2018, and comprising issues No. 5–8, and Volume 3: Finale releasing on October 23, 2018, and comprising issues No. 9–12.

The series concludes the story arc from the video games involving Juno, and sees Charlotte de la Cruz's Assassin cell forming an uneasy alliance with Juhani Otso Berg to combat the Instruments of the First Will, who have infiltrated both the Assassins' and the Templars' ranks and plan to resurrect Juno so that she may conquer humanity. The series also features a parallel ancestor storyline set during the Spanish Civil War in 1937.

Assassin's Creed: Last Descendants – Locus 
Assassin's Creed: Last Descendants – Locus is a four-part comic book miniseries released as a tie-in to Matthew J. Kirby's Last Descendants novel trilogy. The miniseries is written by Ian Edginton, with art by Caspar Wijngaard, and was published by Titan Comics from September to December 2016. The story follows Sean Molloy, a character from the Last Descendants trilogy, who uses the Animus to relive the memories of his ancestor Tommy Greyling, a Pinkerton detective. In 1872, Greyling becomes caught in a Templar plot to steal a Precursor manuscript from the British Museum, and must work together with Evie Frye and Henry Green to thwart it.

Assassin's Creed: Reflections 
For the franchise's tenth anniversary in 2017, Ubisoft announced a four-part comic book miniseries, titled Assassin's Creed: Reflections. Each issue was written by Ian Edginton, illustrated by Valeria Favoccia, and published by Titan Comics, and presents a different narrative revolving around an established Assassin (Ezio Auditore, Altaïr Ibn-LaʼAhad, Edward Kenway, and Ratonhnaké꞉ton / Connor), as viewed by Juhani Otso Berg in the modern-day.

Assassin's Creed: Origins 
Assassin's Creed: Origins is a four-part comic book miniseries based on the game of the same name. Written by Anne Toole and Anthony Del Col, with art by PJ Kaiowá, it was published by Titan Comics from March to June 2018. The miniseries is set after the events of the game, primarily in 30 BC in the waning days of the Ptolemaic Kingdom, with flashbacks to 44 BC following Amunet in Rome as she deals with the aftermath of Julius Caesar's assassination.

Assassin's Creed: Blade of Shao Jun 

Assassin's Creed: Blade of Shao Jun (known in Japan as Assassin's Creed: China) is a manga adaptation of Assassin's Creed Chronicles: China, written and illustrated by Minoji Kurata. It has been serialized in Shogakukan's seinen manga magazine Monthly Sunday Gene-X from October 19, 2019, to June 17, 2021.

Assassin's Creed: Dynasty 
Assassin's Creed: Dynasty is a manhua first serialized in August 2020 via the Tencent-owned online platform AC.QQ in collaboration with Ubisoft. Written by Xu Xianzhe with art by Zhang Xiao, the manhua is set in 755 during the Tang dynasty, and follows the journey of Li E as he joins the Hidden Ones and eventually becomes a Master Assassin. The original run concluded with its 38th and final chapter in August 2022. A French language version of the manhua is set to release beginning in April 2023.

Assassin's Creed: Valhalla – Song of Glory 
Assassin's Creed: Valhalla – Song of Glory is a three-part comic book miniseries which serves as a prequel to Assassin's Creed Valhalla, following the separate exploits of Eivor Varinsdottir and her adoptive brother Sigurd Styrbjornsson in 870, two years before the events of the game. Written by Cavan Scott and illustrated by Martín Túnica, the miniseries was published by Dark Horse Comics from October to December 2020.

Assassin's Creed: Valhalla × Vinland Saga
Makoto Yukimura drew a 7-page crossover manga chapter between Assassin's Creed Valhalla and his series Vinland Saga that was uploaded to Ubisoft's website on October 23, 2020.

Assassin's Creed: Valhalla – Blood Brothers 
Assassin's Creed: Valhalla – Blood Brothers is a manhua first serialized in November 2020 via the AC.QQ online platform in collaboration with Ubisoft. Written by Feng Zisu, the manhua is set in the 860s and centers on the Stensson brothers, Ulf and Björn, who follow Ivarr the Boneless to England in pursuit of glory. The original run concluded with its fifth and final chapter in June 2021.

Assassin's Creed: Valhalla – Forgotten Myths 
Assassin's Creed: Valhalla – Forgotten Myths is a three-part comic book miniseries which serves as a prequel to the Dawn of Ragnarök expansion for Assassin's Creed Valhalla, following Thor, Baldr, and Heimdall as they investigate an attempted invasion of Asgard by the Muspels. The miniseries is written by Alex Freed, with art by Martín Túnica, and was published by Dark Horse Comics from March to May 2022.

Assassin's Creed: Valhalla – The Converts 
Assassin's Creed: Valhalla – The Converts is a French language graphic novel written by Mathieu Gabella, illustrated by Paolo Traisci, and pubilshed in France by Glénat Editions on January 25, 2023. Set after the events of Assassin's Creed Valhalla, it follows a young monk-turned-apprentice Hidden One named Edward and the Viking Niels Gunnarssonas of the Raven Clan as they travel together to Scotland to solve a dangerous mystery.

Untitled webtoon 
An as-of-yet untitled webtoon which follows Edward Kenway after the events of Assassin's Creed IV: Black Flag is set to be released in 2023 by Redice Studio.

Novels

Assassin's Creed: Encyclopedia
UbiWorkshop released an encyclopedia of the Assassin's Creed series in 2011. Initially intended as an art book, the project gathered so much material that the company decided to expand it into an encyclopedia. It features works of artists, such as Craig Mullins, Tavis Coburn, 123Klan, Gabz and James NG. Artists were given creative freedom, as they were able to create a unique Assassin from the period of their choosing. The art book contains a carte blanche section, which is going to contain fan-submitted artwork.

In November 2012, to coincide with the release of Assassin's Creed III, UbiWorkshop released a second edition of the encyclopedia. This Edition contained an additional 120 pages of content, covering both Assassin's Creed III and Assassin's Creed: The Chain, as well as revised content based on feedback.

The Third Edition of the Assassin's Creed: Encyclopedia is an updated hardcover edition incorporating information of characters and events from Assassin's Creed IV: Black Flag and Assassin's Creed: Brahman along with new artwork and concept art. It was released worldwide on November 11, 2013, and includes 390 pages of new content and a revised version of the second edition, which is also available to purchase from UbiWorkshop.

Audio drama

Assassin's Creed Gold
Assassin's Creed Gold is an Audible audio drama by Anthony del Col, released February 27, 2020. The four-hour drama follows a card shark and hustler called Ailyah Khan (Tamara Lawrence), who is enlisted by Gavin Banks (John Chancer) to relive the memories of 17th century Assassin Omar Khaled (Riz Ahmed). The production also features the voices of Anthony Head, as Isaac Newton, and Danny Wallace, who reprises his series role as Shaun Hastings.

Board games
A board game, Assassin's Creed: Arena, was launched on February 26, 2014. Inspired by Assassin's Creed: Revelations, it features many characters from the game, including Shahkulu, Anacletos, Odai Dunqas and Oksana Razin, as well as original characters.

On September 17, 2018, Triton Noir announced a new board game called Assassin's Creed: Brotherhood of Venice. Set in 1509, between the events of Assassin's Creed: Brotherhood and Revelations, it includes characters from the video games like Ezio Auditore da Firenze, Leonardo da Vinci, and Lucrezia Borgia, as well as new characters like Alessandra. It was developed by Thibaud de la Touanne, and was estimated to provide more than 20 hours of play. The game was set to release in November 2018,  but was delayed and eventually released in August 2021.

Assassin's Creed Symphony
Assassin's Creed Symphony is a tour across North America and Europe featuring composers who worked on the soundtracks of each game in the series, including Jesper Kyd, Lorne Balfe, Brian Tyler, Austin Wintory, Sarah Schachner, Winifred Phillips, Elitsa Alexandrova, Chris Tilton, Ryan Amon, and The Flight. It was scheduled to begin in the summer of 2019, and expected to feature holographic characters from the series. The 2019–2020 tour was canceled due to the COVID-19 pandemic.

The concert Assassin’s Creed Symphonic Adventure, developed by Overlook Events, was presented in a world premiere in Paris on October 29, 2022, at the Le Grand Rex. The world premiere celebrate the 15th anniversary of the game series. An international world tour is scheduled to begin in 2023. The concert is to a two-hour performance with a full symphonic orchestra, also featuring a choir and soloists.

Reception

The Assassin's Creed series have received mainly positive reviews from critics, with Blast Magazine calling it "the standout series on [the seventh generation] of consoles". It has been praised for its ambitious game design, visuals, and narratives but criticized for its technical issues and annual releases of almost every installment; the series' shift, which started in Origins, towards prioritising role-playing mechanics over stealth in several games has been considered polarizing.

, the series has sold over 140 million copies with over 95 million players, becoming Ubisoft's best selling franchise and one of the highest selling video game franchises of all time. By September 2022, total sales of the series had reached 200 million.

Cultural impact
Elements of Assassin's Creed have been introduced as content into other Ubisoft games and those from third parties. The macOS and Microsoft Windows versions of Team Fortress 2 (2007) features two cosmetic items for the Spy class that were added to promote  Assassin's Creed: Revelations; the first is the series' signature Hidden Blade, while the second is a hood based on the one Ezio wears in the game. Sackboy, the player character from LittleBigPlanet and LittleBigPlanet 2, can be equipped with a skin resembling Ezio's outfit. In Prince of Persia (2008), Altaïr's costume can be unlocked with a code obtained by pre-ordering the game. In 2010's Prince of Persia: The Forgotten Sands, there is an outfit resembling Ezio's robes in Assassin's Creed II, which is unlockable through Uplay. Final Fantasy XIII-2 (2011) includes a costume based on Ezio's outfit from Assassin's Creed: Revelations as an optional costume option as downloadable content.

In Metal Gear Solid 4: Guns of the Patriots (2008), Altaïr's outfit is an unlockable cosmetic option for Solid Snake; it was originally announced as an April Fools joke by game director Hideo Kojima. Kojima later returned the favor by allowing Ubisoft to include a Raiden outfit in Assassin's Creed: Brotherhood. In Metal Gear Solid: Peace Walker (2010), the player can jump into a bale of hay from a rooftop, which includes the Eagle sound effect used in the Assassin's Creed games, and use it to attract and subdue enemies. The Assassin Order is referenced by a character. In the 2009 Wii game Academy of Champions: Soccer, Altaïr appears as a playable character along with other Ubisoft characters. In the 2012 game Soulcalibur V, Ezio appears as a playable fighter and is featured on the box art. In July 2022, both Ezio and Eivor were added as playable fighters in Brawlhalla (2017).

Assassin's Creed IV: Black Flag (2013) introduces the character of Olivier Garneau, the CEO of video game company Abstergo Entertainment, who helps Ubisoft to develop the Assassin's Creed video games within the franchise's fictional universe. During the events of the game, Garneau goes to Chicago, the setting of Ubisoft's 2014 video game Watch Dogs. In the latter game, Garneau is the subject of a side mission that sees the playable protagonist Aiden Pearce saving him from being kidnapped; it is implied this was done by the Assassin Brotherhood. Additionally, two characters in the game are seen playing Assassin's Creed II. Ubisoft has described those appearances as small Easter eggs, and has neither confirmed nor denied a shared continuity between both franchises. Assassin's Creed Origins (2017) mentions the news about Garneau's incident in Chicago, along with a picture of Aiden Pearce killing Garneau.

In downloadable contents (DLC), Ubisoft collaborated with Square Enix to hold a limited-time Assassin's Creed-themed festival event crossover in Final Fantasy XV (2016) on consoles under the title Assassin's Festival, which lasted from August 31, 2017, to January 31, 2018. The DLC featured gameplay elements from the Assassin's Creed game series, new additional quests, mini-games, and exclusive Assassin's Creed-themed items. In January 2020, Nintendo released a Mii Fighter costume based on Altaïr as downloadable content in the crossover fighting game Super Smash Bros. Ultimate (2018).

In August 2021, Ubisoft released a free update for their 2020 game Watch Dogs: Legion that featured a non-canonical crossover with the Assassin's Creed series. The update introduced optional story content, which sees DedSec crossing paths with and subsequently helping Darcy Clarkson, a member of the modern-day Assassin Brotherhood and a descendant of Jacob and Evie Frye. Darcy is also included as a playable character and features a unique Assassin-themed playstyle.

See also
List of best-selling video game franchises

Notes

References

External links

 
 

 
Ubisoft franchises
Fiction set in 2012
Fiction set in 2013
Fiction set in 2014
Fiction set in 2015
Fiction set in 2016
Fiction set in 2017
Fiction set in 2018
Fiction set in 2019
Fiction set in 2020
Action-adventure games
Alternate history video games
Video games about ancient astronauts
Artificial intelligence in fiction
Open-world video games
Panhistorical video games
Parkour video games
Science fiction video games
Stealth video games
Video game franchises introduced in 2007
Video games about virtual reality
Fiction about assassinations
Video games with historical settings
Mass media franchises
Video games adapted into comics
Video games adapted into films
Video games adapted into novels
Video games adapted into television shows